Tokat Arif Nihat Asya High School is a high school in Tokat, Turkey. The school is named after the Turkish nationalist poet Arif Nihat Asya (1904–1975). Education is mainly in Turkish and English.

History 
The high school was founded in 2005 by Musa Günay, who became the first principal. After his leaving the school in winter 2006, Ayhan Kaymak took over the post. The current principal is Abdurrahman Yıldırım, who serves in this position since 2007.

Administration 
 Ayhan KAYMAK, Principal (2007–present)

External links
Tokat Arif Nihat Asya High School Official Web Site

Educational institutions established in 2005
High schools in Turkey
Tokat
2005 establishments in Turkey